NASCAR on ESPN is the now-defunct former package and branding of coverage of NASCAR races on ESPN, ESPN2, and ABC. ABC, and later the ESPN family of networks, carried NASCAR events from the sanctioning body's top three divisions at various points from the early 1960s until 2000, after the Truck Series rights were lost. However, ESPN resumed coverage of NASCAR with the Nationwide Series race at Daytona in February 2007 and the then-Nextel Cup Series at Indianapolis in July 2007. ESPN's final race was the Ford EcoBoost 400 at the Homestead–Miami Speedway on November 16, 2014, with Kevin Harvick winning that year's NASCAR Sprint Cup Series championship.

History

Prior to 2007

ABC's involvement with NASCAR began in the days of ABC's Wide World of Sports in the 1960s, in which it presented some of the biggest races in stock car racing.  One of its events was the Daytona 500.  ABC showed the last half of the race, except in 1976, when it showed the first 30 laps, went to the Olympics and then came back for the wild finish, in which David Pearson edged out Richard Petty with both cars sliding sideways across the track.  The race TV rights went to CBS Sports in 1979, who reportedly pioneered live flag-to-flag NASCAR race coverage.  For much of the 1970s and 1980s, ABC broadcast NASCAR races on tape delay.  The commentary was added later in post production.  They would actually sit in the booth and call something live if they needed to for the satellite feed.  Otherwise, ABC would do all the editing afterwards for the final telecast.

ESPN began showing NASCAR races in 1981, with the first event being at North Carolina Speedway.  The last of its 265 Cup telecasts (that number includes some on ABC Sports) was the 2000 NAPA 500 in Atlanta (now the Folds of Honor QuikTrip 500).  Even though Fox, FX, NBC, and TNT were the exclusive broadcasters of the Winston/Nextel Cup Series and the Busch Series from 2001 to 2006, the ESPN networks still carried the Craftsman Truck Series in 2001 and 2002 because the Truck races were under a separate contract; ESPN had been broadcasting Truck races since the inaugural race in 1995. Speed Channel took over the Truck broadcasts in 2003.

2007-2014

The TV show promo of NASCAR on ESPN, ESPN2 and ABC in 2007 can be seen as a sneak peek in the 2006 Disney/Pixar animated film Cars on DVD and VHS in the 2.39:1 widescreen and 1.33:1 fullscreen versions. ESPN (and ABC) regained rights to air NASCAR races in 2007 after NBC Sports dropped NASCAR at the end of 2006. Each race telecast began with the pre-race show NASCAR Countdown. As of the 2011 season  Nicole Briscoe was the usual host, with Brad Daugherty and Rusty Wallace providing commentary. It was typically 1 hour for Sprint Cup and major Nationwide races and a half-hour for all other Nationwide races. In addition to the races, ESPN2 aired a daily show called NASCAR Now, which was similar to Baseball Tonight and NFL Primetime.  It aired daily on ESPN2 and was hosted by Briscoe, with various others substituting. Unlike other league shows on ESPN such as NFL Live, Baseball Tonight, and College Football Live, NASCAR Now only aired during the NASCAR season.

In 2007, 29 of the 35 Busch races aired on ESPN2, with the other five airing on ABC.  ESPN2 started its coverage with the Orbitz 300 at Daytona International Speedway on February 17, 2007. ABC's first race was the Sam's Town 300 at Las Vegas on March 10. The first NEXTEL Cup race telecast was the Brickyard 400 on July 29 on ESPN.  The next 5 races aired on ESPN and the Richmond race and the final 10 races (the Chase for the NEXTEL Cup) appeared on ABC.

The initial broadcast team consisted of Jerry Punch as the lead announcer with Wallace and Andy Petree as analysts. Allen Bestwick, Mike Massaro, Jamie Little, and Dave Burns were the pit reporters. Brent Musburger, Suzy Kolber, and Chris Fowler contributed as studio hosts.

In 2008, ESPN moved Wallace and Bestwick from their positions. Bestwick became studio host while Wallace joined the studio team. Dale Jarrett, who had retired during the 2008 season and had worked part-time for the network afterward, joined Punch and Petree as booth analyst. Shannon Spake replaced Bestwick on pit road.

In 2009, the Monday edition of NASCAR Now became a roundtable show, similar to the old Inside NEXTEL Cup show that was on Speed Channel.  Bestwick hosts the roundtable; he is also the former host of the Speed Channel program.  The panelists rotate and have included Mike Massaro, Johnny Benson, Boris Said, Ray Evernham, and Ricky Craven.  Massaro has also filled in as host, including after the 2010 Daytona 500. Beginning with the 2010 season, ESPN carried fourteen of the seventeen races, including the entire Chase for the Sprint Cup except for the Bank of America 500 which continued to be televised on ABC. ABC acquired the Irwin Tools Night Race and kept the Air Guard 400 as part of its race coverage. Previously, ABC aired the entire Chase for the Sprint Cup and the Richmond race (now known as the Federated Auto Parts 400), but NASCAR's decision to standardize early start times conflicted with ABC's expanding Sunday morning political talk show lineup. This led to consternation among ABC's Southern affiliates, who counted on the races as a bulwark against NFL games on competing CBS and Fox stations. This decision was in-line with ESPN taking over the rights to the Rose Bowl and the British Open as part of an ongoing strategy to shift sports programming from ABC to ESPN, to the outrage of many sports fans.

The ESPN family of networks continued to be exclusive home for almost every NASCAR Nationwide Series event. 22 of those races were on ESPN2, with ABC carrying four and ESPN nine. Marty Reid, who for the past several seasons was the lead play-by-play announcer for Indy Racing League events on the ESPN family of networks, became its lead NASCAR voice for the 2010 season replacing Jerry Punch. Andy Petree and Dale Jarrett returned as color commentators, while Punch moved to lead pit reporter.  The April 2011 race from Richmond International Raceway was produced and broadcast by SPEED due to conflicts with the NFL Draft and the NBA Playoffs which are also broadcast by ESPN. The April 2013 and April 2014 Richmond races had the same conflicts, but in those years were carried on ESPNews.

The end of NASCAR's 30-year run on ESPN
On November 16, 2014, the Ford EcoBoost 400 at Homestead-Miami Speedway marked the end of NASCAR's 30-year, two-stint run on ESPN, dating back to 1981 and also, ending an eight-year stint with the network since 2007.  Allen Bestwick, who served as lap-by-lap announcer for ESPN's Sprint Cup Series races since 2011, worked his final NASCAR broadcast on network television, marking the end of his role with the network in 29 years covering the sport and remained with ESPN and ABC covering IndyCar races from 2015 to 2018.

Production

Each broadcast began with NASCAR Countdown, ESPN's pre-race show. Using a mobile pit studio similar to FOX's Hollywood Hotel, the pre-race was typically led by host Nicole Briscoe with Brad Daugherty and Rusty Wallace. Daugherty and Wallace may be absent for weekends of Nationwide-only races, and Wallace occasionally moved to the broadcast booth for Nationwide races. The studio was not used at Nationwide races where ESPN was responsible for both the Sprint Cup and Nationwide Series races at two different tracks. The studio had not been used at Road America events where ESPN had brought a skeleton crew since the race was ESPN's only broadcast of the weekend due to the Little League World Series. The pre-race show was 30 minutes for Nationwide races and an hour for Sprint Cup races. Cuts to commercials saw a plastic NASCAR Countdown logo in city attractions outside the track.

Practice and qualifying session broadcasts also originated from the studio and drivers would occasionally enter the studio during qualifying to preview their runs. Sprint Cup drivers had also been seen in the booth to commentate on Nationwide races.

All races were presented in high-definition, and all cameras, including those in the race cars, were capable of sending out HD pictures. Starting in 2011, in-car cameras were able to provide two camera angles instead of just one.

At the Bashas' Supermarkets 200 at Phoenix International Raceway on April 20, 2007, NASCAR on ESPN unveiled a new feature, "Full Throttle".  In this feature, which took place on one restart a race, the audio was provided by various team communications between drivers, crew chiefs, and spotters, similar to Fox's "Crank it Up".  Typically, this lasted for about one lap.  This frequency had been reduced from its earlier use, and was not seen at all in 2011.

Also in 2011, NASCAR on ESPN switched to a 16:9 aspect ratio letterbox presentation, matching that of Fox.  This letterbox presentation, which was seen on ESPN and ESPN2, was not seen on Nationwide and Sprint Cup Series races aired on ABC, which still showed the race in the 4:3 standard-definition, non-letterbox format.

When NASCAR returned to ESPN in 2007, the starting grid was shown scrolling across the top of the screen, and it was not discussed. The time was instead used for ESPN's "In-Race Reporter" segment, in which fan questions were asked to drivers over the radio. Fox also used this tactic at the time (doing pit reports over the starting grid), an idea used by Fox from 2004-2008. However, while Fox switched back to traditional starting grids in 2009 and discussing them, ESPN continued using the scrolling grid throughout its entire run. On two occasions, ESPN did run a traditional starting grid with drivers' full names and talked about the grid. These occasions were the 2007 Busch Series race at Mexico City, in which many of the drivers were not regular NASCAR drivers and background information was warranted, and the 2014 season finale at Homestead-Miami, which was ESPN's final NASCAR broadcast.

The pit studio

The ESPN pit studio was one of the most technologically advanced mobile studios in all of sports. The entire studio could be elevated  and had  of glass so the hosts and the fans could see the track. In 2008, the studio was re-decorated and used by ABC News to cover the New Hampshire presidential primary. The studio also used state-of-the-art LED lighting to light up the hosts.

Coverage and other controversies

General
Many visitors to forums and blogs such as The Daly Planet complained that the coverage seen on ESPN and its related networks between 2007 and 2014 were not up to the standards set by the earlier version of network coverage.  Their biggest complaints were excessive commercials, bored announcers, abuse of production technology, and language that seemed to talk down to them.  Many said that they had found alternate means of racing coverage, including NASCAR Hot Pass, radio broadcasts, the magazine NASCAR Illustrated and the NASCAR website.  Some were even looking forward to the return of NASCAR on Fox, despite the gimmicks inherent to that portion of the racing season.

On October 4, 2008, SportsCenter reported that the Roush-Fenway Racing trio of Matt Kenseth, Carl Edwards, and Greg Biffle were leading the championship standings. Johnson has always driven for Hendrick Motorsports during his Cup career, and never for Roush-Fenway Racing.

The many changes made in 2008, specifically the removal of on-air personalities with no previous NASCAR backgrounds and the reassignment of Wallace, may have come in response to these complaints.

NASCAR itself was disappointed at the production job done by ESPN at 2009 AMP Energy 500, the fall Talladega race. The morning of the race, in response to recent accidents at the track where cars went airborne (specifically, Carl Edwards flying into the catch fence after being turned in the tri-oval by Brad Keselowski on the last lap of the spring race), NASCAR instituted a rule banning bump drafting during the race. ESPN commentators frequently commented on how boring the race was because of the rule change, despite statistically (with 57 lead changes and 25 leaders) being comparable to past races at the track. The rule change itself proved ineffective at preventing car flips and accidents, as evidenced by Ryan Newman's blowover with five laps to go on the back straightaway, then Mark Martin's turnover in a crash in the tri-oval during the attempt at a green-white-checkered finish, and was quickly reversed before the 2010 season.

ESPN often did not recognize the title sponsors of events in its coverage unless their respective sponsors also pay a sponsorship fee to ESPN. Events without sponsorship deals with ESPN are presented by the network under generic titles with ESPN-furnished sponsors; for example, the Sunoco Red Cross Pennsylvania 500 was once branded as "NASCAR Sprint Cup Series at Pocono presented by Old Spice" by the network.

In NASCAR on ESPNs advertising campaign, their slogan was "Feel your heart race", a slogan which had already been trademarked by Kyle Petty's Victory Junction Gang. The latter's advertising also appeared on ESPN-carried races. This was changed to "Cause it's Racing" in 2010 and "Nothing Beats First Place" in 2011 and 2012.

During broadcasts since 2010, several improvements were made, including reduction in technology. There were also changes in announcing and pit reporters, most notably the moving Jerry Punch to pit road and IndyCar and occasional Nationwide Series lead announcer Marty Reid to lead broadcaster for the majority of NASCAR broadcasts beginning in 2010, including the Sprint Cup races. Sponsorship by non-NASCAR sponsors was also reduced. Allen Bestwick, formerly the lap-by-lap announcer for NBC's NASCAR coverage from 2001 to 2004, took over as lead broadcaster for Sprint Cup Series races in 2011.

Once the Chase for the Sprint Cup began and even in the races leading up to the Chase, ESPN often shifted its focus to the drivers in the Chase, in particular Jimmie Johnson. Often if a driver not in the Chase was leading and was passed for the lead by a Chase driver, he was not spoken of again for the rest of the broadcast. Case in point: in the November 2009 race in Texas, the vast majority of the broadcast was spent talking about Jimmie Johnson despite the fact he crashed on lap 3 and finished 38th. This was a fear of many once the Chase was introduced.

Finally, in 2010, ESPN with the consent of NASCAR, changed the networks that races were broadcast on. While the final eleven races of the season were broadcast on ABC from 2007–2009, all Sprint Cup races except for the three Saturday Night races in ESPN's portion of the schedule were switched to ESPN (the Bristol night race, previously on ESPN, was moved to ABC). This left only 3 races on over-the-air broadcasters for the last two-thirds of the NASCAR season. This, combined with the moving of the Brickyard 400, arguably NASCAR's second biggest race to ESPN, angered fans and sponsors.

Broadcast interruptions
Due to ESPN's various sports commitments, there were several interferences with NASCAR broadcasts. This was especially true once college football season started, when Nationwide Series races would often follow an early college football game. The broadcast start had also been delayed by the Little League World Series and ATP tennis. Many times (at least 15 as of 2010), NASCAR Countdown and even the start of the race were moved to ESPN Classic or, later, ESPNEWS. Due to contractual agreements with Turner, ESPN could not put broadcasts with ESPN3, another fact that angered fans. However, in 2011 an agreement was reached letting ESPN put all NASCAR programming on WatchESPN.

In 2010, because of the movement of the Chase races to ESPN and the earlier standardized 1:00 PM ET start times instituted by NASCAR, ESPN moved NASCAR Countdown to ESPN2 for all Chase races starting at 1:00 PM ET to avoid shortening or moving its Sunday NFL Countdown program. Viewers had to switch to the race at 1:00 PM ET from ESPN2 to ESPN. The next year, NASCAR moved the Chase races to later times (2:00 ET, then 3:00 ET for the final three races; Martinsville maintained a 1:30 PM ET starting time because, at the time, that track lacked lights and the grandstands cast long shadows over the racing surface in the late afternoon).

Network preemptions and relocations
On September 30, 2007, the end of the LifeLock 400, part of that season's Chase, was moved from ABC to ESPN2 when a rain delay went past 6 p.m. ET, the end of the allotted broadcast window. This was in contrast to Fox and NBC coverage, which typically stayed on those stations even if the races ran long past the expected time.
On March 15, 2008, the Sharpie Mini 300 moved from ABC to ESPN Classic at 6:15 p.m. so that ABC could show World News Saturday in the Eastern and Central time zones.  The race was in a rain delay at the time and it was not resumed.
On May 2, 2008, the Lipton Tea 250 was moved from ESPN2 to ESPN Classic due to ESPN2's commitment to cover game 6 of the Cleveland Cavaliers-Washington Wizards first-round NBA playoff series. Because ESPN Classic had a much more limited potential audience than ESPN or ESPN2, NASCAR asked Speed Channel to simulcast the race, and it agreed.  ESPN2 then rebroadcast the race in its entirety after the basketball game.  A similar arrangement was reached for the Kroger On Track for the Cure 250, scheduled for October 2008 at Memphis Motorsports Park, due to conflicts with college football and the Breeders' Cup.
On November 9, 2008, the conclusion of the Checker O'Reilly Auto Parts 500 moved from ABC to ESPN2 because the race exceeded the allowable broadcast window due to two red-flag delays. ABC affiliates in the Eastern and Central time zones aired America's Funniest Home Videos instead, while those in the Mountain and Pacific time zones stayed with race coverage, with ESPN2 serving as a simulcast.

On August 22, 2009, at the Sharpie 500 at Bristol Motor Speedway, both the invocation and the national anthem were preempted because the Little League World Series game ran long.
On July 31, 2010, the first 23 laps of the Nationwide Series U.S. Cellular 250 at the Iowa Speedway, as well as all pre-race programming, were moved to ESPN Classic because of a semifinal match at the ATP Legg Mason Classic that ran long. This came shortly after the channel was upgraded to more expensive channel tiers on DirecTV and Dish Network, among other providers.
The following day, on August 1, the final round of the Women's British Open ran a few minutes past 1 p.m. ET, meaning that the pre-race ceremonies of the Pennsylvania 500 were preempted.  ESPN2, which picked up NASCAR Countdown from ESPN due to the conflict, had to start its coverage of the X Games at that time.  However, the race itself was not affected.
On October 2, 2010, NASCAR Countdown and the first several laps of the Kansas Lottery 300 were aired on ESPN Classic due to the Clemson-Miami football game running longer than anticipated.
On October 31, 2010, due to technical difficulties, the last 45 minutes of the Sunday NFL Countdown and the first 57 laps of the 2010 AMP Energy Juice 500 were preempted on some providers.
The 2011 Bubba Burger 250 scheduled for April 29 was moved from ESPN to Speed due to anticipated conflicts on both ESPN (with the second night of the 2011 NFL Draft) and ESPN2 (one or more NBA playoff games). Unlike past conflicts, this broadcast was produced entirely by SPEED combining their Truck & FOX's Sprint Cup broadcasting teams. In 2013 and 2014, when faced with a similar predicament, the Richmond spring Nationwide race was scheduled for ESPNEWS, but the 2014 race, whose start was delayed by rain, was moved to ESPN2 after the Toronto Raptors-Brooklyn Nets game ended.
ESPNEWS was also used for the Nationwide Kentucky fall race due to its scheduling for a Saturday night during college football season.
On September 20, 2014, NASCAR Countdown for the VisitMyrtleBeach.com 300 Nationwide race at Kentucky Speedway was preempted by a college football game between Texas State and Illinois that was delayed by lightning.
On October 11, 2014, the 2014 Bank of America 500 at Charlotte Motor Speedway, the final race to be broadcast on ABC, had its opening preempted by a late running college football game between TCU and Baylor. Coverage was moved to ESPNEWS (where it was also preempted because of a preseason NBA game between the Cleveland Cavaliers and the Miami Heat from Rio de Janeiro going into overtime), and was also stated to be on WatchESPN.com, which it wasn't. Fans voiced their anger on NASCAR's official live chat, and RaceBuddy was not provided on the website due to the race being on a broadcast network (RaceBuddy was later provided for all races starting in 2015, possibly in response to the controversy surrounding this race). The only way fans could get the start was by radio broadcast on PRN, or from the live lap-by-lap feed on the NASCAR App for smartphones. The first 25 laps were missed, and coverage was joined at a planned competition caution. A recap of the first 25 laps was almost immediately shown. NASCAR was also unhappy with the move and issued an apology. NASCAR later posted the full race (a practice that they had begun at Pocono's August race in 2014) on their official YouTube channel but with the world feed; the difference was all ESPN logos on graphics were removed. The race was further preempted on KATV in Little Rock, Arkansas when they went into local news instead, as did a few other ABC affiliates across the country.

Local station preemptions
The Subway 500 from Martinsville Speedway was not shown on KABC in Los Angeles (the second largest media market in the United States) on October 21 due to the California wildfires of October 2007, specifically the Buckweed fire in Santa Clarita and the Canyon fire in Malibu.  Instead, the broadcast was shown on their 7.2 digital subchannel, which did not have universal availability.
Several stations chose to preempt NASCAR Countdown for local news or to fulfill their weekly FCC-required educational and information programming requirements, either through the Saturday morning  ABC Kids lineup or later, Litton's Weekend Adventure.  KABC did so before every Saturday night race in 2007 and 2008, and also did it before the 2007 Ford 400, a Sunday-afternoon event due to E/I requirements. This also occurred with WPLG in Miami, Florida and KSAT-TV in San Antonio, Texas at least once in 2007, and on November 1, 2009, the day of the 2009 AMP Energy 500, when KXLY-TV in Spokane, Washington preempted NASCAR Countdown to carry ABC Kids programming.
Other stations preempted NASCAR Countdown for their own paid programming, as has been done by some ABC affiliates for NBA Countdown.
At the other end of the scale, KTKA in Topeka, Kansas left the 2007 Bank of America 500 on October 13 to launch its nightly late newscast at 10 p.m. Central time and did not return.  Topeka is located about 60 miles from Emporia, Clint Bowyer's hometown.  KSAT also aired a brief news update, which came during a red flag, but returned in time for the checkered flag.
The 2008 Sharpie Mini 300 was not seen on several ABC stations for various reasons, ranging from weather bulletins (WSB in Atlanta and WSOC in Charlotte) to the Big 12 basketball tournament (KLKN in Lincoln, Nebraska and WOI in Des Moines, Iowa, among other stations in the conference's footprint).  In addition, WABC in New York City carried the race, but preempted NASCAR Countdown and the rain delay to cover breaking news involving a construction accident at a high-rise building in Manhattan.
The pre-race for the 2008 Bank of America 500 was not seen on at least seven stations: KABC, KSAT, WPVI in Philadelphia, WXYZ-TV in Detroit (of which Brad Keselowski's hometown of Rochester Hills is a suburb), WEWS in Cleveland, WFTS in the Tampa Bay area, and KXLY.  All of them aired newscasts, except for WXYZ, which aired a charity fundraiser.
The final eight laps of the 2008 Pep Boys Auto 500 were not shown on KOAT, the ABC affiliate in Albuquerque, New Mexico. The station cut away at 4 p.m. Mountain time for a live pre-scheduled congressional debate for the state's 1st District seat.  The ending was shifted to ESPN2, but only those receiving KOAT on local cable (mostly Comcast) were able to see it; those who received the station via satellite continued to get the national feed of ESPN2.
Multiple stations every August preempted the Irwin Tools Night Race for local coverage of NFL preseason football; in most cases the race then aired live on a station's digital subchannel or sister station, had a local substitution on a local cable channel or ESPN/ESPN2, or was not carried at all. Rarely, they were tape-delayed for overnight viewing.  One market, West Michigan, is unique in having two ABC affiliates, and when WZZM-TV preempted the 2012 race due to a Detroit Lions preseason game, WOTV broadcast the race live as to not tie up affiliate distribution complications to the market.
In 2010, the Irwin Tools Night Race was preempted on WXYZ-TV for coverage of the Woodward Dream Cruise.
In 2011, the Irwin Tools Night Race was preempted on most Mid-Atlantic and Northeast ABC affiliates for local news coverage of Hurricane Irene.
During a rain delay in the 2012 Federated Auto Parts 400, WJLA-TV in Washington, DC cut out of the ESPN on ABC broadcast of the race to air the primetime local news and did not return to the race broadcast when the race resumed.  After running the newscast, WJLA went to a local commercial break and then rejoined the race broadcast at 11:46 p.m., several minutes after the race resumed.

Missing race endings
On August 24, 2007, the final five laps of the Food City 250 NBS race at Bristol Motor Speedway were not televised by ESPN2 (but were shown on broadcasters outside of the United States, such as Canada's TSN).  The reason was that a satellite uplink path was somehow eliminated, preventing the master control at the network headquarters (ironically in Bristol, Connecticut; the track is in Bristol, Tennessee) from re-transmitting the event to cable and satellite providers.  Instead, viewers saw a blank screen, then the ESPN2 logo "screensaver", then some commercials.  By the time the problem was rectified, the race was over, with Kasey Kahne as the winner.  Jerry Punch, the lap-by-lap announcer, apologized for the error immediately and the final two laps were shown on a replay unedited.  In addition, the first rebroadcast showed the same laps as they were intended to be broadcast with an on-screen ticker and GEICO sponsorship bug just after 4:30 a.m. ET the next morning.  An ESPN spokesman blamed a "human error" of an unspecified nature.
With nine laps remaining in the 2008 Federated Auto Parts 300, one or more feeds of ESPN2 on DirecTV suddenly cut off and was replaced by a static screen of the provider's logo, with audio from XM Satellite Radio's Top Tracks channel.  By the time the picture returned, the race was over and Brad Keselowski celebrated his first win in the series, by then renamed Nationwide Series.  The exact cause of the failure is unknown.  Blogger John M. Daly blamed the problem on an error in the routing system in which the picture is sent to master control, and that neither ESPN2HD nor cable companies were affected.  However, on a message board dealing with TV auto racing, moderator Cheryl Lauer reported that the opposite had happened to her, that HD was out while SD was broadcasting normally.  She thought the problem was due to a complication in testing signals from a new satellite, D11.

Other problems/issues
Due to college football commitments and an exceedingly long race which had 25 caution flags, coverage of the Busch Series' Sam's Town 250 on October 27, 2007 ended the moment David Reutimann took the checkered flag to win the race. There was no post-race interview with Reutimann, summary of the finishing order, or any other usual post-race programming. No interview aired on ESPNEWS or SportsCenter either, another decision that rankled some long-time fans.
Coverage of the Nationwide Series' Jimmy John's Freaky Fast 300 at Chicagoland Speedway on September 13, 2014 ended the moment Kevin Harvick took the checkered flag due to the race exceeding its broadcast window and ESPN2 having a college football game between Alabama and Southern Mississippi, scheduled right after the race.
Some drivers had testy relationships with ESPN reporters.
Tony Stewart was fined and docked 25 points after his win at the Allstate 400 in 2007 when he used an obscenity in his post-race interview. During it, he implied unfair treatment by the network in the past.
Also in 2007, Dale Earnhardt Jr. looked very uneasy in his interview with Mike Massaro at the Chevy Rock and Roll 400; Massaro ran a lengthy talk after Earnhardt Jr. dropped out with engine failure.
In 2009, Juan Pablo Montoya walked out on an interview with Vince Welch after the Pennsylvania 500 due to a line of questioning he was not happy with.
 In 2010, during driver intros, Jamie Little kept giving Kevin Harvick questions while Harvick was visibly annoyed and replied with short answers and even following him onto the truck continuing the conversation.
 In 2011, Kurt Busch, while getting ready to do an interview with Jerry Punch, kept telling him in a profanity-laced insult to hurry up. Punch canceled it but it was leaked on camera which led to the firing of Kurt Busch at Penske Racing. 
Most of the races broadcast on ESPN on ABC had minimal or no post-race coverage. Several times, ESPN only interviewed the winner and second-place finisher. The most likely explanation is that the next program was, typically, ABC World News Sunday or a local newscast; the network wanted to start the newscast as soon as possible.
At the 2007 Dickies 500 at Texas Motor Speedway, the majority of the coverage was focused on Jeff Gordon and Jimmie Johnson. There was only one mention when Juan Pablo Montoya led the opening laps of the race and ESPN on ABC did not air several of the lead changes or mention them on air. In addition, during the Busch Series O'Reilly Challenge race at Texas, the final laps were broadcast from an in-car camera of points championship leader Carl Edwards.  ESPN did not air the finish of the race where Kevin Harvick won and instead stayed with an in-car shot of Edwards through the finish.
At the 2007 UAW-Ford 500 at Talladega, ESPN on ABC did not air the final lead change as they were covering a battle a little deeper in the field.  Jeff Gordon made the race winning move without mention of the lead change on ESPN on ABC until well after it had happened. Gordon won the race.
At the 2010 Sunoco Red Cross Pennsylvania 500, Kurt Busch and Elliott Sadler crashed violently on lap 165. ESPN could get multiple angles of Busch's crash, but due to this being a blind spot on the track, ESPN only had one angle showing Sadler's crash (even then, partially out of frame), leaving many fans angry about not knowing how Sadler crashed and hit the inside wall.
Shortly after the 2011 DRIVE4COPD 300, ESPN lost audio just as race winner Tony Stewart was about to answer a question. Due to those technical problems, ESPN began its special edition of SportsCenter from an infield studio at Daytona early. The interviews with Stewart and Dale Earnhardt Jr. were still recorded and played back 18 minutes later with the audio restored. However, the usual final tape montage and proper sign-off was not shown, at least not in the original live versions.
At the 2011 Tums Fast Relief 500 at Martinsville, ESPN did not show the final lead change, because Brad Keselowski spun around while Tony Stewart made the race winning move around Jimmie Johnson. RaceBuddy viewers, though, were able to see it from Stewart and Johnson's onboards.
At the 2013 NASCAR Nationwide Series event at Kentucky Speedway, Marty Reid made a human error and said that Ryan Blaney had won the race when the white flag was waving, even though Blaney continued on and won the race. The following Tuesday, Reid was released from the network; his future plans have not been discussed. Allen Bestwick called the rest of the 2013 and most of the 2014 NASCAR Nationwide Series events and also called ABC's IndyCar events starting in 2014.
At the 2014 GEICO 500 at Talladega, the ESPN broadcast completely missed Tony Stewart spinning out in the tri-oval with two laps to go. The commentators didn't notice nor mentioned it after the race ended.

Ultimate NASCAR
In addition to race coverage, ESPN aired a series of programs called Ultimate NASCAR.  The series began in April 2007, when the network began to air a series of 100 one-minute vignettes highlighting NASCAR's most important moments as selected by a panel of experts.  The vignettes aired every day until July 29.  These moments are also recounted in a companion book published by the network.

In July 2007, ESPN aired a series of related documentaries.  Three of them were countdown shows, ranking the greatest drivers, races, and rivalries in the sport's history. The other shows were "The Explosion" (a general overview), "The Dirt" (the origins of NASCAR), "The Cars" (the evolution of the NASCAR race car), "The Families" (an in-depth look at the Allison, Earnhardt and Petty families), and "Speed and Danger" (in which NASCAR drivers discuss the risks they take).

Lineup variations
In order to reduce the workload of announcers during the first half of the season, ESPN constantly changed the lineup of those who covered the activities on the race track.  In the 2007 season, ESPN used three different lap-by-lap announcers (Punch, Marty Reid, and Allen Bestwick), four different color commentators (Wallace, Petree, Jarrett, and Randy LaJoie), ten different pit reporters (Jack Arute, Bestwick, Dave Burns, Gary Gerould, Jamie Little, Mike Massaro, Marty Smith, Spake, Johnson, and Vince Welch), six infield studio hosts (Musburger, Bestwick, Massaro, Chris Fowler, Erik Kuselias, and Suzy Kolber), and at least four infield studio analysts (Daugherty, Brewer, Wallace, and Ray Evernham).  Three times during the season, the network did not use an infield studio for NASCAR Countdown, during the split races (where Nextel Cup and Busch Series were in different venues during the same weekend).  Also, none of the talent was at every race.  In 2007, Daugherty had the longest streak, being at every race until the Meijer 300 at Kentucky Speedway on June 16.

The main booth remained the same for all Sprint Cup races.

In 2008, Jarrett was to be granted two months off from the end of April to the end of June to prepare for being the analyst for all 17 Sprint Cup races.

The exact team to be used at each race is listed in an ESPN press release on this page.

See below for a more detailed list of announcers and their roles.

Announcers

Studio and pre-race shows

 - John Kernan was the primary weekday host. On weekends that ESPN and ABC were covering Cup races, a weekend host would fill in on the Friday editions, as well as if there was a race postponed until Monday, through November 2000.

Race Coverage

NOTE: Ned Jarrett only appeared on races broadcast by the ESPN family of networks during his time there. He had a separate contract with CBS Sports and was thus precluded from working races televised on ABC.

See also
NASCAR Countdown
NASCAR Now
NASCAR Drivers: Non-Stop
ESPN2 Garage
Jayski's Silly Season Site
NASCAR in Primetime

References

External links
 NASCAR.com (NASCAR's Official website)
 Jayski 
 FanZone Sports (NASCAR News)
 The Daly Planet (Website breaks down TV and Media coverage)
 NASCAR on ESPN Media Guide
 NASCAR Issues Still Confusing ESPN

1981 American television series debuts
2002 American television series endings
2007 American television series debuts
2014 American television series endings
American Broadcasting Company original programming
ABC Sports
ESPN original programming
ESPN
1990s American television series
English-language television shows